is a role-playing video game, which was developed and published by Japanese company Kadokawa for Android and iOS. It is the first mobile game of the original series.

Gameplay 
Metal Max: Fireworks is a role-playing video game featured "monsters vs. tanks". Similar as its predecessors, players needs to battle with enemies by themselves or by vehicles.

Development 
Metal Saga: Fireworks was first announced on July 10, 2015.

References

External links 

  

2015 video games
IOS games
Android (operating system) games
Metal Max
Video games developed in Japan